"Ring of Fear (A Dangerous Assignment)" is the second episode of the TV series Police Squad!. It was directed by Joe Dante, written by Tino Insana and Robert Wuhl and produced by Robert K. Weiss.

Plot
The story begins during a boxing match, which is won by boxer Mike Schultz. However, the fight was "fixed" and Schultz was supposed to deliberately lose the match (i.e., "go in the tank"), but he won anyway, much to the annoyance of crime boss Montague Martin who presumably lost money betting on the outcome of the fight. In retaliation, Martin sends his goon Luca Burnett to kill Schultz. Investigators initially rule the death a suicide, but Captain Ed Hocken isn't convinced that a boxer would kill himself right after the biggest win of his career. Believing that they are dealing with murder and corruption, Ed decides to send Frank Drebin undercover. The plan is to find a good boxer and straighten him up to draw the interest of Martin.

At the local gym (Jim's Gym) Frank meets Buddy Briggs, a talented up-and-coming boxer whose rise to prominence has been thwarted by Martin's fixing of fights in the city. Frank wants to manage Buddy, but needs Buddy's management contract for that. Frank seeks out Buddy's corrupt manager Saul Cooper, who is acting in league with Martin and was also Schultz's manager (and who had earlier warned Schultz not to cross Martin just before he was killed). Cooper is playing his cronies in a private poker game in the back of Jim's Gym. Frank introduces himself as Bob Kelly with a lot of "long green", i.e., money to gamble with, which is misinterpreted by one of the cronies as Lorne Greene. When Frank corrects them by saying, "No, I mean I've got cash," the same guy assumes that he also manages Johnny Cash (as well as the Goodyear Blimp). They allow Frank to join the game and the stakes begin to climb, with the pot growing to include cash, gold, gems, Monopoly playing pieces—and eventually Buddy Briggs' contract. Ultimately Frank wins (with a full house and his revolver as his ace-in-the-hole), and gets Buddy's contract. However, Cooper warns that even though he's got Buddy's contract, he'll never get another fight in the city again.

Act II: Bruté

Arriving later at the Police Squad crime lab, scientist Ted Olsen shows Frank and Ed the facial hair recovered from the Schultz' crime scene through a microscope (in a parody of a Gillette Atra shaving advertisement of the early 1980s). The hair belongs to Luca Burnett, the man who killed Mike Schultz, and a known associate of Martin. Frank's next step is to train Buddy Briggs. At Buddy's apartment, the audience meets Buddy's wife, Mary. Buddy and Mary's relationship is contentious. Mary has been drinking and calls Buddy a bum who could have been a contender (a spoof of the famous quote from On the Waterfront.) She claims that Martin and Cooper "own him" and storms out of the apartment, returning briefly to get her St. Bernard named "Muffin". Buddy clearly loves Mary and wants to give her everything she has always wanted, including her own synagogue. Frank promises to help Buddy fight fair and win, claiming that he and Mary have been living in the sewers too long. When Frank leaves their apartment, the front door is actually a manhole in the street.

Buddy and Frank decide to meet at Morey's Bar in the evening, to arrange a fight with "The Champ", who is managed by Cooper and Martin. Once there, Cooper introduces "Bob Kelly" to Martin as the "guy who manages Lorne Greene and Johnny Cash". Frank tries to get Martin to agree to a fight between Buddy and The Champ, but Martin promises he will never get a fight in this city because "I own this town!" Frank then tries to offend The Champ directly by shouting that he is dishonest and only wins because of guys "lying down or dying", but this does not work. Despite a torrent of insults from Frank, The Champ remains courteous and composed. Dejected and believing that a fight will never happen, Buddy then says "forget it" and prepares to leave. Upon hearing this seemingly innocent remark, The Champ becomes enraged, shouting that "No one says 'forget it' to me!" The Champ tries to hit Buddy, but Buddy blocks his punch and then hits back, knocking down The Champ. With that, a boxing match between Buddy and The Champ is on.

The evening of the fight, Martin walks into Buddy's dressing room and tells him that he has kidnapped Mary. He threatens her safety unless Buddy "takes a dive" in the 12th round. He shows him Mary's toaster to prove he's not bluffing. Buddy is upset because he trained to win the fight, but now he has to lose. Frank promises Buddy that he will find Mary and that he should still beat The Champ. Frank needs to find Mary before the fight is over and needs answers fast so he goes to see Johnny the Snitch. Johnny tells Frank that Mary is being held hostage by Luca Burnett at Jim's Gym. When Frank arrives, Mary has already untied the ropes binding her, and tries to escape. Luca wakes up and takes her into the steam room at gunpoint. A shootout between Frank and Luca begins, which is completely obscured due to the steam. However, we hear Frank finally shoot Luca, and Frank and Mary drive back to the boxing match, where Buddy is about to lose.

During the boxing match in a continuation of the gag where Martin shows Buddy things belonging to Mary to prove he has her, Martin holds up Mary's washing machine. Buddy is knocked down by The Champ. On the canvas, he begins drooling uncontrollably and hallucinating about Mary (and The Wizard of Oz), with The Champ promising that Buddy will "always be a bum". However, Mary enters the arena and shouts "Buddy!" On seeing that Mary is safe, a reinvigorated Buddy jumps up and knocks out The Champ with a single punch. At the end of the match, Buddy and Mary embrace, and Buddy calls out Martin for his crimes in front of the reporters. Martin tries to leave the arena but Ed and Frank arrest him, with Ed saying that from now on the boxers in the city will have to lose honestly.

Epilogue
The epilogue is at the station. Frank and Ed discuss the case, and Martin is brought in wearing handcuffs. Frank says that Martin will have to do his fight fixing from the Statesville Prison from now on.

Recurring jokes
Tonight's special guest star: Georg Stanford Brown, dressed in the uniform of a police officer, cautiously walking a city street with his gun drawn. He is promptly killed off, Police Squad! style, by a falling safe.
Next week's experiment: "...remember to bring three things from your mother's dresser."
Johnny's next customer: A heart surgeon needing help with a patient's bypass operation.
Freeze frame gag: Everyone freezes but Martin. He realizes what is happening and attempts to escape but finds the door is blocked. With no other way out, he ultimately tries to make his way through the camera lens towards the viewer (breaking the fourth wall) but can't make his way past the glass barrier.

References

External links

 

Police Squad! episodes
1982 American television episodes